In mathematics, the Maurer–Cartan form for a Lie group  is a distinguished differential one-form on  that carries the basic infinitesimal information about the structure of . It was much used by Élie Cartan as a basic ingredient of his method of moving frames, and bears his name together with that of Ludwig Maurer.

As a one-form, the Maurer–Cartan form is peculiar in that it takes its values in the Lie algebra associated to the Lie group . It is given as the pushforward of a vector in  along the left-translation in the group:

Motivation and interpretation

A Lie group acts on itself by multiplication under the mapping

That is, a manifold  identical to the group , but without a fixed choice of unit element. This motivation came, in part, from Felix Klein's Erlangen programme where one was interested in a notion of symmetry on a space, where the symmetries of the space were transformations forming a Lie group. The geometries of interest were homogeneous spaces , but usually without a fixed choice of origin corresponding to the coset .

The Maurer–Cartan form gives an appropriate infinitesimal characterization of the principal homogeneous space. It is a one-form defined on  satisfying an integrability condition known as the Maurer–Cartan equation.

Construction

Intrinsic construction
Let  be the tangent space of a Lie group  at the identity (its Lie algebra).  acts on itself by left translation

such that for a given  we have

and this induces a map of the tangent bundle to itself:

A left-invariant vector field is a section  of  such that 

The Maurer–Cartan form  is a -valued one-form on  defined on vectors  by the formula

Extrinsic construction

Characterization as a connection
If we regard the Lie group  as a principal bundle over a manifold consisting of a single point then the Maurer–Cartan form can also be characterized abstractly as the unique principal connection on the principal bundle . Indeed, it is the unique  valued -form on  satisfying

 
 

Properties

where the bracket on the left-hand side is the Lie bracket of vector fields, and the bracket on the right-hand side is the bracket on the Lie algebra . These facts may be used to establish an isomorphism of Lie algebras

Similarly  is the Lie derivative along  of the -valued function .

so

This is known as the Maurer–Cartan equation. It is often written as

Here  denotes the bracket of Lie algebra-valued forms.

Maurer–Cartan frame
One can also view the Maurer–Cartan form as being constructed from a Maurer–Cartan frame. Let  be a basis of sections of  consisting of left-invariant vector fields, and  be the dual basis of sections of  such that , the Kronecker delta.

Thus . Thus, the Maurer–Cartan form can be written

Suppose that the Lie brackets of the vector fields  are given by

The quantities  are the structure constants of the Lie algebra (relative to the basis ).  A simple calculation, using the definition of the exterior derivative , yields

so that by duality

This equation is also often called the Maurer–Cartan equation.  To relate it to the previous definition, which only involved the Maurer–Cartan form , take the exterior derivative of :

The frame components are given by

which establishes the equivalence of the two forms of the Maurer–Cartan equation.

On a homogeneous space
Maurer–Cartan forms play an important role in Cartan's method of moving frames. In this context, one may view the Maurer–Cartan form as a  defined on the tautological principal bundle associated with a homogeneous space. The Maurer–Cartan form on the Lie group  yields a flat Cartan connection for this principal bundle. In particular, if }, then this Cartan connection is an ordinary connection form, and we have

which is the condition for the vanishing of the curvature.

In the method of moving frames, one sometimes considers a local section of the tautological bundle, say .  (If working on a submanifold of the homogeneous space, then  need only be a local section over the submanifold.)  The pullback of the Maurer–Cartan form along  defines a non-degenerate -valued -form  over the base.  The Maurer–Cartan equation implies that

The differential of  gives a compatibility condition relating the two sections on the overlap region:

where  is the Maurer–Cartan form on the group .

A system of non-degenerate -valued -forms  defined on open sets in a manifold , satisfying the Maurer–Cartan structural equations and the compatibility conditions endows the manifold  locally with the structure of the homogeneous space .  In other words, there is locally a diffeomorphism of  into the homogeneous space, such that  is the pullback of the Maurer–Cartan form along some section of the tautological bundle.  This is a consequence of the existence of primitives of the Darboux derivative.

Notes

References

 
 

Lie groups
Equations
Differential geometry